Ri Hyo-sun (born 5 August 1991) is a North Korean judoka.

She participated at the 2018 World Judo Championships, winning a medal.

References

External links
 

1991 births
Living people
North Korean female judoka
Judoka at the 2014 Asian Games
Asian Games medalists in judo
Asian Games bronze medalists for North Korea
Medalists at the 2014 Asian Games
21st-century North Korean women